39th Street may refer to:
39th Street (Chicago), Illinois
39th Street (Kansas City), Missouri
39th Street (Manhattan), New York City
39th Street (Sacramento RT), Sacramento, California